Events in the year 1990 in Belgium.

Incumbents
 Monarch: Baudouin
 Prime Minister: Wilfried Martens

Events
 4 to 5 April – Constitutional crisis: King Baudouin suspended as king for 36 hours after refusing to sign a law legalising abortion
 26 June – City of Antwerp adopts the Globaal structuurplan, a first attempt at structured urban planning for the whole city and regeneration of dockland neighbourhoods.
 28 October – German-speaking Community Council election

Publications
 Brian Bond, Britain, France, and Belgium, 1939-1940 (Brassey's)
 B. Francq and D. Lapeyronnie, Les deux morts de la Wallonie sidérurgique
 Donald Flanell Friedman, The Symbolist Dead City: A Landscape of Poesis (Garland)
 Leen Van Molle, Ieder voor allen: De Belgische Boerenbond, 1890–1990 (Leuven University Press, Kadoc Studies 9)

Drama
 Hugo Claus, Four Works for the Theatre, translated by David Willinger, Luk Truyts and Luc Deneulin

Art and architecture

Cinema releases
 Koko Flanel, directed by Stijn Coninx

Visual arts
 Jan Fabre, Tivoli
 Luc Tuymans, Body

Births
 1 January – Fazlı Kocabaş, footballer
 10 January – Jeroen D'hoedt, athlete
 13 March – Anne Zagré, athlete
 18 May – Dimitri Daeseleire, footballer
 31 May – Amelie Lens, DJ
 23 March – Raffaele Chiarelli, footballer
 21 June – Nadine Khouzam, hockey player
 12 July – Yassine El Ghanassy, footballer 
 18 July – Laurine Delforge, hockey umpire
 19 July – Laurens Paulussen, footballer
 21 July – Evelyn Arys, cyclist
 12 August – Danira Boukhriss, newscaster
 28 August – Louis Verhelst, cyclist
 26 September – Jade Foret, model
 6 October – François D'Onofrio, footballer
 16 October – Antoine Demoitié, athlete (died 2016)
 28 November – Dedryck Boyata, footballer
 22 December – Juliette Van Dormael, cinematographer
 24 December – Thomas Van der Plaetsen, athlete

Deaths
 11 February – Léopold Anoul (born 1922), footballer
 12 February – Gustaaf Hulstaert (born 1900), entomologist
 5 March – Karel Thijs (born 1918), cyclist
 14 March – Léo Souris (born 1911), composer
 7 June – Max Loreau (born 1928), philosopher
 8 June – Remy Van Lierde (born 1915), fighter pilot
 9 June – Charles Paul de Cumont (born 1902), general
 19 June – Karel Sys (born 1914), boxer 
 29 June – René Boël (born 1899), industrialist
 5 July – Simona Noorenbergh (born 1907), missionary
 13 August – André Canonne (born 1937), writer and librarian
 27 August – Gérard Garitte (born 1914), Orientalist
 28 August – Robert Jan Verbelen (born 1911), collaborator
 30 August – Jacques Grippa (born 1913), politician
 2 September – Léon Van Hove (born 1924), scientist
 14 September – Wim De Craene (born 1950), singer
 30 October – Germaine Van Dievoet (born 1899), Olympic swimmer
 3 December – André Vlerick (born 1919) economist and politician
 11 December – Fernand Collin (born 1897), banker

References

 
1990s in Belgium
20th century in Belgium
Events in Belgium
Deaths in Belgium